Goodwood is a rural locality in the Bundaberg Region, Queensland, Australia. In the  Goodwood had a population of 175 people.

Geography 
The North Coast railway line passes along Goodwood's eastern boundary from south to north with  Goodwood railway station and Kinkuna railway station serving the locality.

History 
Goodwood Provisional School opened on 18 October 1900. On 1 January 1909 it became Goodwood State School.

In the  Goodwood had a population of 175 people.

Education 
Goodwood State School is a government primary (Prep-6) school for boys and girls at 1802 Goodwood Road. In 2018, the school had an enrolment of 45 students with 3 teachers (2 full-time equivalent) and 6 non-teaching staff (3 full-time equivalent).

References 

Bundaberg Region
Localities in Queensland